Adil Nabi (born 28 February 1994) is an English professional footballer who plays as an attacking midfielder for Greek Super League 2 club Athens Kallithea.

He was an academy product at West Bromwich Albion, but never made a first-team appearance. Nabi was the first player to be loaned from the Premier League to the Indian Super League, playing in the 2015 season for the Delhi Dynamos. In January 2016, he joined Peterborough United, where he played 10 total games in two years before a loan to Nuneaton Town. Nabi then had a short spell with Scottish club Dundee before playing in Greece for OFI, Atromitos and Athens Kallithea.

Club career

West Bromwich Albion
Born in Aston, Birmingham, Nabi joined the academy of West Bromwich Albion as an eight-year-old. After rising through the academy ranks, he signed his first professional contract with the club in 2011. He was named in a matchday squad for the first time on 12 January 2013 in an away Premier League match at Reading, remaining unused as West Brom lost 3–2. After the 2014–15 season, Nabi was named Albion's Young Player of the Season. For the under-21 team, he recorded 26 goals and 12 assists in 73 games.

Loan to Delhi Dynamos
On 28 August 2015 it was announced that Nabi would be loaned to the Delhi Dynamos of the Indian Super League for the 2015 season. West Brom board member Adrian Wright stated that the move was for the benefit of all parties, rather than speculation that it was to increase the club's commercial interests in India. Nabi was the first player to be loaned from a Premier League club to an ISL team. His teammates included UEFA Champions League winners Roberto Carlos, John Arne Riise and Florent Malouda, the first of whom was player-manager.

On 4 October, he made his professional debut for the Dynamos in their opening match of the season against Goa at the Fatorda Stadium, coming on as a 73rd-minute substitute for Chicão as they fell 2–0. He played only 31 minutes of the first five matches of the season for the capital-based team, but said that he was experiencing a personal growth which would not have been possible had he been loaned to a lower-league English club. On 19 November, he scored his first professional goal, opening a 3–1 win over FC Pune City at the Jawaharlal Nehru Stadium.

He added a second on 3 December, as the team who had already qualified for the play-offs came from behind to achieve a 3–3 home draw against Kerala Blasters. In the last game of the regular season three days later, he scored again in a 2–3 loss to Goa, and finished the season with 3 goals from 11 games as they were eliminated by the same team in the semi-finals; he was sent off for dissent on 15 December in a 3–0 away loss in the second leg.

Peterborough United
On 21 January 2016, Nabi joined Peterborough United for an undisclosed fee, signing a contract lasting until 2019. Two days later, as a 57th-minute substitute for Erhun Oztumer, he made his debut in English football, in the Posh's 2–1 loss to Gillingham in League One. On 13 February, he made his first start for the team, in their 0–4 loss to Bradford City at London Road. Speaking in January 2017, Director of Football Barry Fry said that: "Nabi was all set to go to Port Vale, but they sacked their manager (Bruno Ribeiro) and the caretaker-boss (Michael Brown) there is not so keen".

On 3 February 2018, having gone 14 months without an appearance – with that being a dead rubber EFL Trophy game against Walsall – Nabi was loaned to National League North strugglers Nuneaton Town for the rest of the season. He played five games for them as a substitute, and did not score.

Dundee 
Following his release from Peterborough, Nabi trained in the summer of 2018 at Dundee, and on 2 August he signed a six-month contract. He made his debut for the Scottish Premiership club nine days later, as a half-time substitute for Lewis Spence at home to Aberdeen, and forced a save in the 1–0 loss. He made ten appearances for the Dee, scoring once to open a 2–1 home loss to Kilmarnock on 6 October. Nabi was released by Dundee in December 2018, at the end of his contract.

Greece
In January 2019, Nabi announced on Twitter that he had signed for OFI. He described the move as "crazy". In his debut against Panetolikos on 20 January, he scored two free kicks in a 3–0 home win. He was named Superleague Greece's player of the week, and satellite channel Nova Sport named his goal as the best in Europe that week. Nabi scored a free kick very late into the second leg of the relegation play-offs against Cretan rivals Platanias that ensured a win and a place in the 2019–20 Superleague.

On 26 January 2022, Nabi signed for Atromitos also in Greece's top flight, on a deal until 2024. A year and a day later, he signed for Super League Greece 2 club Athens Kallithea.

International career 
Adil is yet to represent any international team but he remains eligible to play for Pakistan. His younger brothers, Rahis and Samir, have already played for the Pakistan national football team.

Style of play
West Bromwich Albion academy manager Mark Harrison stated in November 2015 that Nabi was equally as gifted in technical and finishing abilities as the team's first-choice striker Saido Berahino, who had partnered Nabi at youth level.

Personal life
Nabi is of Pakistani descent. His younger brothers Samir and Rahis are also professional footballers, having progressed through West Brom's academy. He is a practising Muslim.

Career statistics

References

External links
 
 Delhi Dynamos Profile

1994 births
Living people
English people of Pakistani descent
British sportspeople of Pakistani descent
British Asian footballers
English Muslims
Footballers from Birmingham, West Midlands
English footballers
West Bromwich Albion F.C. players
Odisha FC players
Peterborough United F.C. players
Nuneaton Borough F.C. players
Dundee F.C. players
OFI Crete F.C. players
Atromitos F.C. players
Kallithea F.C. players
Association football forwards
Indian Super League players
English Football League players
Scottish Professional Football League players
Super League Greece players
Super League Greece 2 players
English expatriate footballers
Expatriate footballers in India
English expatriate sportspeople in India
English expatriate sportspeople in Greece
Expatriate footballers in Greece